Marcus Heimonen (born 11 October 1993) is a Finnish professional footballer who is a free agent. His playing position is defensive midfielder. He was also a member of the Finland national team and a team player for Gnistan. His preferred position is defensive midfielder, but he can play in other midfield roles.

References

External links
 

1993 births
Living people
Finnish footballers
Association football midfielders
Veikkausliiga players
FC Honka players
Sportspeople from Vantaa
Kotkan Työväen Palloilijat players
Sudet players